Dealing with It! is the second studio album by the American hardcore punk band D.R.I., which was released in 1985. Although the band started their migration towards a heavy metal influence, this album still retains the band's roots.

Track listing

Credits
 Spike Cassidy – guitar, bass
 Kurt Brecht – vocals
 Felix Griffin – drums
 Mikey Offender – bass

References

D.R.I. (band) albums
1985 albums
Metal Blade Records albums